Jandiala is a village in Jalandhar district in the Indian state of Punjab.

Jandiala is a village in Jalandhar district in the Indian state of Punjab. Jandiala is also known as Jandiala Manjki, (A part of a small area known as Manjki region). Jandiala is a big village as compared to the surrounding villages. 
Jandiala is located at the centre of a circle with its curvature passing through many major towns such as Nakodar (14Km), Jalandhar (20Km), Phagwara (14Km), Goraya (12Km), Phillaur(21Km) and Nurmahal (8Km)
The village Jandiala now looks like a city. There were mandis of dozens of surrounding villages. As a result, the municipality was formed by the British government in the third quarter of the nineteenth century, but due to strong opposition from the people, it was disbanded in 1872. However, in 1998, the Punjab government issued a notification to the Nagar Panchayat But then similar protests arose and within four years the Nagar Panchayat was dissolved. As a result, Jandiala was once again deprived of urban amenities. It is generally believed that the reason for the protest was the imposition of excise duty on imported goods. But some believe that this village of patriots believes in a complete people's system and when the bureaucracy prevailed due to the Nagar Panchayat, the villagers did not like it. Some politicians, through village shopkeepers, had approached the Punjab and Haryana High Court to have the notification canceled. Well-meaning people don't like it. Jandiala, one of the largest villages in the Doaba, now has a panchayat, but its sarpanch is recognized equal to an MLA. 

Jandiala's revenue records show that the total area of ownership of the village is 3399 acres out of which (according to the figures of 2006 census) the village is situated on sixty one acre and farming is done on two thousand nine hundred and eighty nine acres. Thirty-five acres is ‘Barani’ and two thousand nine hundred and ninety-four acres are ‘Chahi’. Of this, one hundred and sixty-seven acres are Mushtaraka and one hundred and eighty-two acres are owned by the Panchayat. According to CENSUS 2006, the total number of houses is 1666..

The people of Jandiala believe that the foundation stone of Jandiala Manjki was laid in 1426 by a Johal Jatt named Ladha. His nephew Dhunni was also with him at the time. But some believe that the navel came much later. When Ladha settled down, he had laid the foundation of his ‘dera’(Camp) with a ‘Jand tree’ which was called ‘Morhi Gadna’. Due to this, the name of Ladha Johal's dera became Jandwala. The Jand tree, which was gutted by lightning many years ago, is still standing, but after many years, it started turning green again. Pipple has also sprouted in the Jand, which was struck by lightning. According to legend, this Jand tree has withered many times in the past centuries. People believe this myth to be true because the present event has happened before their eyes.

After all, the story of the migration of the Johals goes back to Central Asia, but the Johals of Jandiala consider their former settlement to be the village of Dhaleke near Moga. Some of the families who had come up from village Dhaleke had settled at Thabalke village, about two and a half kilometers from the present Jandiala. The village is still inhabited but not as flourishing as Jandiala even though there is a railway station. The story of coming from Thabalke to Jandiala is very interesting. Residents believe that they used to give more milk when their elders used to graze their milch cattle on this side. He also realized the secret that the water of a large pond (dhab) built on this place is very beneficial. The mound came to be known as the 'Baan wala Chhaparh' and is still maintained by the villagers. Then some of them settled down nearby. The rest of Johal remained there whose heirs are still living there.

The people of Jandiala are politically, educationally and economically strong and conscious. Jandiala is a revolutionary village from the very beginning. The village played an important role in the freedom struggle and produced prominent political leaders. Jandiala is the only village in India where two flags were hoisted in the village square called ‘Jhandian wala chowk’. A red flag with hammer and sickle (Communist Party of India) and another tri colour flag (Congress Party). The two flags are about five feet apart. Jandiala has produced 81 patriots. Baba Lal Singh, Baba Dhian Singh, Baba Waryam Singh, Baba Gurdit SinghAnd Baba Puran Singh's sacrifices made the Ghadar movement even brighter. Munsha Singh Dukhi was from here that he got the taste of patriotism. He touched the hearts of Punjabis through revolutionary poems. Bhai Chanchal Singh  is a prominent name associated with the Babbar Akali movement. Bhai Sher Singh, Jagjit Singh Jaggi, Bhai Joginder Singh, Baba Lachhman Singh, Lala Pars Ram, Jai Singh, Kartar Singh Kirti, Hazara Singh Kainth  who fought in the Jaito Morcha, made important contributions in the freedom struggle. 

No one has yet been able to grasp the secret of Jandiala's freedom fighters. Fifty freedom fighters are fighting in one of the six Patti’s  of the village, while one in one Patti  and not one in the other, even though that Patti is very small called  Mohanpurian. There was a stark difference between the political understanding of the people on the east and the west. The Patti that produces fifty freedom fighters is called Barri Patti.

Former Chief Minister of Punjab S. Darbara Singh's village was also Jandiala Manjki. Prominent economist, agronomist and former Vice Chancellor of Punjabi University Patiala Dr. Sardara Singh Johal rose to international prominence from the streets of Jandiala. Today he is the Chancellor of Central University Bathinda.  Former Registrar of Guru Nanak Dev University S. Mohan Singh Johal was also a native of Jandiala. Retired from Punjab State Electricity Board Santokh Singh Johal had his roots in Jandiala. Headmaster Ajit Singh Johal was an important figure in the field of education. The efforts of the late Major Swaran Singh Johal, Major Karnail Singh Johal, Head Master Ajit Singh Johal and Comrade Piara Singh, a degree college named Guru Gobind Singh Republic College was established here in 1967 which was taken over by the government in 1983. Former Dean of Punjabi University Patiala and Head of the Department of Journalism Navjit Singh Johal, Secretary General of Punjab Arts Council and President of Punjab Press Club Dr. Lakhwinder Singh Johal, Ex-Director of Akashbani Davinder Singh Johal, Famous Punjabi poet late Avtar Jandialvi and famous lyricist Tarlochan Singh 'Chan Jandialvi' spent their childhood in the streets of Jandiala. Nachhatar Singh Johal, who broke all previous records from Defense Academy Dehradun and became an Army officer, and Gatibodh Johal, a senior officer in the Indian Oil Corporation, are residents of Patti Dhunni Ki in the same village. Satnam Chana, a journalist, writer, film script writer, TV anchor and former secretary of the International Union of Students, was born and raised in Jandiala. He was also the first Editor-in-Chief of Vidyarthi Jeevan, the first student magazine started in Punjab.
The village has been a hotbed of communist and Congress politics. The soil of this village has been touched by the feet of great politicians. Mrs. Sarojini Naidu, Comrade Nambudripad, BT Randhive, Harkishan Singh Surjit, Ajay Ghosh, Teja Singh Sutantar, Comrade Baba Bujha Singh, Darshan Singh Canadian, Avtar Singh Malhotra, Satpal Dang, Vimla Dang, Jagjit Singh Anand and Baba Bhagat Singh Bilga. At times, Jandialas have been giving political guidance to the people. The Gadar Party's news paper 'Kirti' has been being printed in the house of Fatteke in Patti Barri Jandiala. This family has made a significant contribution to the freedom struggle. The late Pritam Singh Khalsa and the late Comrade Jeet Singh of this family, who had settled in Pilibhit in the seventies, took part in the freedom struggle. The ‘Khara Khooh’ and the ‘Jhandian wala chowk’ have been the center of politics. The village contributed to almost all national independence movements. Any Jatha to take part in any morcha  were begin from 'Jhandian Wala Chowk' Were the red and tricolor flags are still flying at the same time in this square. In order to preserve the memory of Jandiala-related patriots in the hearts of future generations, progressive thinkers have set up a 'Desh Bhagat Yadgar Library' in the flagged square where a large number of valuable books of knowledge are kept.
	
The only rural Government College in District Jalandhar is  called 'Guru Gobind Singh Government College Jandiala'. Earlier this college was private. In the year 1983, the pride of this village went to  S. Darbara Singh's tenure as Chief Minister, the college was taken over by the government.  Baba Bohar of Punjabi Literature Principal Sant Singh Sekhon was the first principal of this college. Dr. Raghveer Singh 'Sirjana', Harcharan Singh Bains and former Sports Director of Punjab University Reet Mahinder Singh have been teaching in this college. Prior to its inception, the college had a high status in the field of education and sports. Manga Bassi, Baljit Bassi, Bakhshinder and film producer Dr. Joginder Singh Bhangalia are old students of this college. But after coming into government, the college has lagged behind in every aspect. Senior Secondary School for Girls in Jandiala, a symbol of village unity Samrai-Jandiala Govermnt  Secondary School for Boys, Republic High School and two government primary schools are spreading the light of education. There is a magnificent building of the primary health center but the health facilities are negative. The absence of high quality private hospitals and specialist doctors is alarming. People have to go to Jalandhar or Phagwara for treatment of minor ailments. For the convenience of the people in the premises of this health center, a non-governmental social organization called 'Jandiala Lok Bhalai Manch' has set up a 'Mortuary' with modern technology. BSNL has a 3000 line telephone exchange.

Many people of this village have migrated abroad for employment. Go to any corner of any country in the world, you will find some Jandialia. The area is economically strong. At present there are twelve commercial banks in Jandiala - Punjab National Bank (two branches), Union Bank of India, State Bank of India, Canara Bank, Punjab and Sind Bank, ICICI Bank, Bank of Baroda. UCO bank, HDFC Bank. Further capital local area bank and branch of a Central Co-operative bank. People of religious devotion built fourteen gurdwaras, six temples, a mosque in the six Patti’s of the village, A Khangah and a huge branch of  Radha Swami Dera Beas have been built. The historic Gurdwara Dehura Sahib associated with Guru Arjan Dev Ji is situated on Jandiala to Nurmahal road.

Before the formation of Pakistan, the Doaba bus owners had formed a transport union called 'Sutlej Transport' in which Bir Singh Johal, Parkasha Singh Johal and Bhai Sher Singh of Jandiala were prominent contributors. The 'Kartar Bus Company' was later formed which was owned by Milkha Singh Johal and Avtar Singh Johal of Jandiala and now the Congress leader  Avtar Singh Henry is owner of this company.

At one time, the ‘Chhinjh’ of Jandiala was very popular in which national level wrestlers took part. Jandiala is now far behind in the field of sports. The village's 'Young Sports Club' has been organizing tournaments on a large scale till the eighties, but the generation since then has shifted from sports to drugs. After poppy, cannabis, opium and smack, chitta dominates today. Political bitterness has also divided sports activities. The name of the village has shone all over the world by Pardeep Singh Johal (s/o Amrik Singh Johal and Grand son of Bans Bhalwan -Bisse Ke family-Patti Barri). In the Commonwealth Games of 2018, he won a silver medal in the 105 kg weight lifting class. He is preparing for Olympic Games. Manjki Sports and Welfare Club Jandiala has started holding Kabaddi competitions every year since 2014 which have become very popular. This initiative of healthy thinkers has been given a lot of encouragement by sports lovers from home and abroad.

The first panchayat elections were held in Jandiala after independence in 1952. The details of the sarpanches elected since then are as follows:
 Giani Sohan Singh from 1952 to 1957
 Giani Sohan Singh from 1957 to 1962
 Comerade Ajit Singh Johal from 1962 to 1967
 Comerade Ajit Singh Johal from 1967 to 1972
 Swaran Singh Johal 1972 to 1977
 Comerade Jagir Singh Johal 1977 to 1982
 Baba Rajinder Singh Johal from 1982 to 1993 (during the period of terrorism in 1987, the government held panchayat elections in Punjab  that is why Baba 
  Rajinder Singh Johal was the Sarpanch till the next 1993 elections keep working
 Gurchetan Singh Johal 1993 to 1998
 Nagar Panchayat formed from 1998 to 2003 but the government did not hold elections
 Baba Rajinder Singh Johal 2003 to 2008
 Comerade Narinder Kaur 2008 to 2013
 Gurbakhsh Kaur Johal 2013 to 2018
 Comerade Makhan Lal Pallan 2018 to

References 

Villages in Jalandhar district
Census towns in Jalandhar district